Ethmia lichyi is a moth in the family Depressariidae. It is found in Central and South America, including Venezuela, Brazil, Panama, Costa Rica, Honduras and Guatemala.

The ground color of the forewings is white, clouded with very pale gray except narrowly adjoining the blackish brown markings. The ground color of the hindwings is semitranslucent white, becoming brownish at the apex.

The larvae feed on Cordia bicolor, Cordia collococca, Cordia eriostigma, Cordia panamensis and Cordia porcata.

References

Moths described in 1973
lichyi